Millicent Vernon Hammond Fenwick (February 25, 1910 – September 16, 1992) was an American fashion editor, politician and diplomat. A four-term Republican member of the United States House of Representatives from New Jersey, she entered politics late in life and was renowned for her energy and colorful enthusiasm. She was regarded as a moderate and progressive within her party and was outspoken in favor of civil rights and the women's movement.

Early life
Born Millicent Vernon Hammond, she was the middle of three children born to the politician and later Ambassador to Spain, Ogden Haggerty Hammond (October 13, 1869 – October 29, 1956) of Louisville, Kentucky and his first wife, Mary Picton Stevens (May 16, 1885  – May 7, 1915) of Hoboken, New Jersey. Her paternal grandparents were General John Henry Hammond (June 30, 1833 – April 30, 1890), who served as chief of staff for William Tecumseh Sherman during the Vicksburg Campaign, and Sophia Vernon Wolfe (1842 – May 20, 1923), daughter of Nathaniel Wolfe, a lawyer and legislator from Louisville. Her maternal grandparents were John Stevens (July 1856 – January 21, 1895), oldest son of Stevens Institute of Technology founder Edwin Augustus Stevens and grandson of inventor John Stevens and Mary Marshall McGuire (May 4, 1850 – May 2, 1905). Ogden Hammond and Mary Stevens got married on April 8, 1907, and both derived from families who were heavily involved in history. Ogden Haggerty Hammond was “the son of a civil war general,” and after his father's passing, he “entrenched himself in all aspects of superior life.” Mary Picton Stevens “was the heir to a fortune based largely on real estate holdings in Hoboken, New Jersey." Millicent's father attended school at Yale University and later in life became a New York financier. She had a sister, Mary Stevens Hammond, and a brother, Ogden H. Hammond, Jr. She was also cousins with John Hammond, the well-known record producer.

During World War I, Mrs. Hammond insisted on going overseas to help those who needed assistance in Europe, despite the potential dangers that were affiliated while doing so. In 1915, when Millicent was 5 years old, her mother perished in the sinking of the British ocean liner RMS Lusitania, which her father survived. When Ogden arrived back home from this tragic event, he did not want to discuss what happened, regarding his wife nor the event, and kept himself busy and distracted by becoming very involved with his work. Everyone, both friends and family, respected his decision and carried on with their normal lives as if nothing transpired. He remarried two years later, to Marguerite McClure "Daisy" Howland, and by that marriage Fenwick had a stepbrother, McClure (Mac) Howland. Ogden's children now had a stepmother. However, Daisy was so preoccupied with herself, Mac, and her social status that she spent minimal time with her stepchildren. Millicent and Daisy did not have a good relationship and her father was no help. If there were any family issues going on, Ogden requested that his children would go to Daisy and not him. After their mother's passing, Millicent developed a closer relationship with her siblings, especially her sister, Mary. In 1918, the trial of the Lusitania took place, as people were suing the ship's company for failure to show passengers aboard the safety precautions. Ogden was one of the many people to testify and when the jury reached the verdict, the Hammonds were each compensated, receiving over sixty thousand dollars.

Raised in comfortable circumstances in Bernardsville, Millicent Hammond attended the exclusive Nightingale-Bamford School in nearby Manhattan, Foxcroft School and college at Barnard College and the New School for Social Research.

In 1931, she met Hugh McLeod Fenwick (February 17, 1905 – July 24, 1991), who was already married to the former Dorothy Ledyard, the daughter of New York attorney Lewis Cass Ledyard. Hugh briefly attended Harvard University before he began working in the field of aviation in Pensacola, Florida. Fenwick later earned the position of becoming a "lieutenant in the flying section of the New Jersey National Guard." The relationship between Hugh and Millicent was kept discreet until he got a divorce. When the two got engaged, Millicent's stepmother was beside herself and Ogden, too, was disappointed with his daughter. Daisy, "a devout Catholic," was so disenchanted with Millicent's marrying a divorced man that she prohibited her from returning to the house. Despite her father's and stepmother's disapproval, Hugh and Millicent got married on June 11, 1932. The couple rented a house in Bedminster, New Jersey for about a year before moving to Bernardsville, New Jersey.

The Fenwicks welcomed their first child, Mary Stevens Fenwick, on February 25, 1934, also Millicent's birthday. Becoming a mother did not come easy to Millicent and she therefore had to hire a nanny to help raise her daughter. When Hugh and Millicent welcomed their second child, Hugo Hammond Fenwick, their marriage started to go downhill. Hugh's dishonesty about telling different stories and lying played a big role in the separation between the two. Hugh relocated to Europe leaving behind an enormous amount of debt his wife had to pay off. After several years of being separated, Hugh and Millicent divorced in 1945. Hugh remarried to Barbara West and had a daughter, Maureen, while Millicent did not remarry and instead focused on working and caring for her children.

While Hugh and Millicent were still together, she briefly modeled for Harper's Bazaar. When they divorced it was difficult for Millicent to find a job that would support both herself and her children because she never received a high school diploma. After searching for jobs and not being recognized by publishers for the stories she wrote, Millicent was hired to work for Vogue magazines as a "caption editor." She stayed with Vogue for a little over a decade and held several job titles while serving her time with them. She concluded her career at Vogue magazines in 1948. She compiled Vogue's Book of Etiquette, which sold a million copies and eventually went on tour around the country. By 1952 Millicent officially retired from work because her children were old enough to support themselves. She also "inherited money," which was substantially enough to support her after retirement.

Political career

Local and state office

During the 1950s, Fenwick became involved in politics via the Civil Rights Movement. Often described as being blessed with exceptional intelligence, striking good looks, and a keen wit, she rose rapidly in the ranks of the Republican Party. She was elected to the Bernardsville Borough Council in 1957, serving until 1964, and around the same time was appointed to the New Jersey Committee of the United States Commission on Civil Rights, on which she served from 1958 to 1974. She was elected to the New Jersey General Assembly in 1969, serving from 1970 to December 1972, when she left the Legislature to become director of the New Jersey Division of Consumer Affairs under Governor William T. Cahill.

U.S. House of Representatives
Elected to Congress from New Jersey in 1974 aged 64, Fenwick became a media favorite during her four terms in the House of Representatives. Known for her opposition to corruption by both parties and special interest groups, she was called "the conscience of Congress" by television newscaster Walter Cronkite. She was one of the most liberal Republicans in the House.

In 1975, the Helsinki Accords were negotiated in Helsinki, Finland. They were primarily an effort to reduce tension between the Soviet and Western blocs by securing their common acceptance of the post-World War II status quo in Europe. One week after the signing of the treaty, Fenwick went to Moscow as a junior member of a congressional delegation. She met refuseniks who wanted to contact American congressmen and held an unofficial meeting with dissident Yuri Orlov. She was thus convinced that political action in America based on the Helsinki Accords would improve human rights in the Soviet Union. Before departing, Fenwick raised some specific cases with Leonid Brezhnev at a final press conference. Returning to the U.S., Fenwick initiated the establishment of the Commission on Security and Cooperation in Europe (CSCE), which oversaw the implementation of the Helsinki Accords. 
Despite her upper-class, society girl background, Fenwick went to Washington with a tough, blue collar work ethic. Virtually any night, hours after typical congressmen had headed out for dinner and home, she stayed working in her Capitol Hill office, and always was willing to answer reporters' questions about her actions.

Once, when a conservative male congressman attacked a piece of women's rights legislation by saying, "I've always thought of women as kissable, cuddly, and smelling good," Fenwick responded, "That's what I've always thought about men, and I hope for your sake that you haven't been disappointed as many times as I've been."

Candidate for U.S. Senator
In 1982, she ran for a United States Senate seat, and defeated conservative Jeffrey Bell in the Republican primary. However, she then narrowly lost the general election to progressive Democratic businessman and Automatic Data Processing CEO Frank Lautenberg in an upset. Even Fenwick herself said in a subsequent interview, "I never expected to lose. I had no concession speech prepared, or anything. I never expected to lose." (In 2008, when Lautenberg was running for reelection to the Senate, his Republican opponents made an issue out of his age — 84 — arguing that he had voiced similar criticisms of the then-72-year-old Millicent Fenwick during the 1982 election campaign. Lautenberg denied having made an issue of Fenwick's age, saying he "only questioned her ability to do the job.")

Ambassador
After leaving the House of Representatives following the 1982 election, Fenwick was appointed by President Ronald Reagan as United States Ambassador to the Food and Agriculture Organization of the United Nations in Rome, Italy. She held this position from June 1983 to March 1987, when she retired from public life at the age of 77.

Later life
Fenwick died of heart failure in her home town of Bernardsville on September 16, 1992.

She was fluent in Italian, French and Spanish.

The Millicent Fenwick Monument, a sculpture by Dana Toomey, was paid for by voluntary donations and unveiled in October 1995. Always decorated, it is near the Bernardsville train station.

Fenwick is considered by some to be the model for the character of Lacey Davenport in Garry Trudeau's comic strip Doonesbury, although Trudeau insisted the character was modeled on no one in particular. Lacey Davenport first appeared several months before Fenwick was first elected to Congress.

She is the grandmother of CEO Jonathan Reckford and great-grandmother of U.S. Olympic rower Molly Reckford.

Legacy
According to biographer Amy Schapiro:
During Fenwick's public service career she earned a reputation for integrity and moral values. Her principled positions, including her opposition to congressional raises and PAC money, prompted Walter Cronkite to call her the “conscience of Congress.” She served as the basis of Garry Trudeau's Doonesbury character Congresswoman Lacey Davenport.

New Jersey Governor Thomas Kean said:
She was the only really ambitious seventy-year-old I've ever met. She loved serving in office, and whether in the state assembly or the United States Congress, she never ceased marveling that she had actually been chosen to represent the people. In legislative bodies she remained a maverick....she hated hypocrisy and those who abused the public trust. Stubborn to a fault, she never betrayed her ideals or paid much attention to the polls. In the end, that was probably why she lost her last election, but the example she set and the way she conducted her life continue to stand as a model for all those who might want to pursue public life.

Electoral history
 1974 U.S. House
 Millicent Fenwick (R), 53.4%
 Frederick Bohen (D), 43.5%
 1976 U.S. House
 Millicent Fenwick (R), 66.9%
 Frank Nero (D), 31.3%
 1978 U.S. House
 Millicent Fenwick (R), 72.6%
 John Fahy (D), 27.4%
 1980 U.S. House
 Millicent Fenwick (R), 77.5%
 Kieran Pillon, Jr. (D) 20.5%
 1982 U.S. Senate
 Frank Lautenberg (D), 51%
 Millicent Fenwick (R), 48%

In popular culture
She was believed by some to be the inspiration behind Lacey Davenport, a fictional character in Garry Trudeau's comic strip Doonesbury.

See also

 Women in the United States House of Representatives

References

Further reading
 Lamson, Peggy. In the Vanguard: Six American Women in Public Life (1979).
 Schapiro, Amy. Millicent Fenwick: Her Way (2003).
 Schapiro, Amy, "Millicent Fenwick" American National Biography (2003) online free https://doi.org/10.1093/anb/9780198606697.article.0700784

Primary sources
 Fenwick, Millicent. "Speak Frankly." Foreign Policy 39 (1980): 11–13. online
 Fenwick, Millicent. Vogue's Book of Etiquette: A Complete Guide to Traditional Forms and Modern Usage (Simon and Schuster, 1948). online free to borrow
 Fenwick, Millicent. Speaking Up (1982), includes her congressional newsletters, editorials, and other articles she wrote.

External links
 MillicentFenwick.com
 Millicent Hammond Fenwick at the Biographical Directory of the United States Congress
Millicent Hammond Fenwick Collection at the Carl Albert Center
 
 

|-

|-

1910 births
1992 deaths
20th-century American politicians
Columbia University alumni
American women ambassadors
Ambassadors of the United States
Activists for African-American civil rights
American feminists
Female members of the United States House of Representatives
New Jersey city council members
People from Bernardsville, New Jersey
Politicians from Somerset County, New Jersey
Reagan administration personnel
Representatives of the United States to the United Nations Agencies for Food and Agriculture
Republican Party members of the United States House of Representatives from New Jersey
School board members in New Jersey
The New School alumni
Vogue (magazine) people
Women city councillors in New Jersey
Women state legislators in New Jersey
20th-century American women politicians
Nightingale-Bamford School alumni